The Legislative Council of Upper Canada was the upper house governing the province of Upper Canada. Modelled after the British House of Lords, it was created by the Constitutional Act of 1791. It was specified that the council should consist of at least seven members. Members were appointed for life but could be dropped for non-attendance. The first nine members of the council were appointed on 12 July 1792. The speaker was usually the Chief Justice of the Court of King's Bench. The Legislative Council was dissolved on 10 February 1841 when Upper and Lower Canada were united into the Province of Canada. Some members were reappointed to the Legislative Council of the united Province.

Unlike the other three provinces that would initially make up the Dominion of Canada, a provincial Legislative Council was not re-established for Ontario when the province entered Confederation in 1867.

List of Members of the Legislative Council

Notes:
 Jacob Mountain was the Anglican Bishop of Quebec; he never attended a session but was not dropped.
 Angus McIntosh never attended a session but was not dropped; he returned to Scotland in 1831.
 James Gordon was re-appointed to the Legislative Council of the Province of Canada in October 1845.
 Alexander Grant, Jr. and Abraham Nelles did not attend after 1832.

Speakers

The Chief Justice of the Court of King's Bench was usually the Speaker of the Council:

 William Osgoode 1792–1794
 Peter Russell 1795–1796
 John Elmsley 1796–1802
 Henry Allcock 1803–1806
 Thomas Scott 1806–1816
 William Dummer Powell 1816–1825
 William Campbell (jurist) 1825–1829
 Sir John Beverley Robinson, 1st Baronet, of Toronto 1829–1840
 Jonas Jones April 1839–June 1840 (interim)

Buildings housing the Legislative Council

The Legislative Council sat in the same building as the Legislative Assembly of Upper Canada:

 Navy Hall at Newark (1792)
 first (1793–1813) and second (1820–1824) Parliament Buildings of Upper Canada at York
 residence of the Chief Justice of Upper Canada (1813–1820)
 old York County Court House on King between Toronto and Church Streets (1829–1832)
 ballroom of York Hotel at York - one session 1813
 York General Hospital (1824–1829)
 third Parliament Buildings of Upper Canada (1832–1840)

Meeting Places

 St. George's Church, Kingston - July 1792; Church demolished 1825 (replaced with St. George's Cathedral), site now Kingston Market Square across from Kingston Custom House (294 King Street East)
 In a tent and later at Navy Hall or Freemasons Hall in Newark - September 1792 – 1796
 Various buildings that housed Parliament at York - 1797-1841

See also
Parliament of Canada
Legislative Assembly of Upper Canada
Legislative Council of Lower Canada
Legislative Assembly of Lower Canada
Legislative Assembly of the Province of Canada
Legislative Council of the Province of Canada
Legislative Assembly of Ontario

References

Handbook of Upper Canadian Chronology, Frederick H. Armstrong, Toronto : Dundurn Press, 1985. 
Dictionary of Canadian Biography Online, University of Toronto Press and Les Presses de l'Université Laval.

External links
Ontario's Historical Plaques

Parliaments of Upper Canada

Defunct upper houses in Canada
1792 establishments in Upper Canada
1841 disestablishments in Upper Canada